"Drain Cosmetics" is the first enhanced single by Norwegian band Serena Maneesh.

ECD Track listing 
 Drain Cosmetics  – 3:41
 Drain Cosmetics (Deadverse Remix) (n:a)
 Don't Come Down Here (Odd's NDSAM Remix) (n:a)
 Sapphire Eyes (Serena-Maneesh Refix)  – 3:12
 Drain Cosmetics (promo video)  – 3:17 Enhanced

7" Track listing 
 Drain Cosmetics  – 3:41
 Sapphire Eyes (Serena-Maneesh Refix)  – 3:12

12" Track listing 
 Drain Cosmetics (Deadverse Remix) (n:a)
 Don't Come Down Here (Odd's NDSAM Remix) (n:a)

Other release formats
 The three original songs are available on the Serena-Maneesh album, released in audio CD and vinyl LP, in 2005 and re-released internationally in 2006.
 The promo video for "Drain Cosmetics" was released as a Digital single Podcast in PlayLouder's site on February 12, 2006.

Media links
Sapphire Eyes (Refix) legal MP3 (Broken Link)
Drain Cosmetics promo video Hi-Fi QuickTime for Win/Mac (Broken Link)

External links
SerenaManeesh.com Official band website

2006 EPs